The 2017 Women's  World Junior Squash Championships is the women's edition of the 2017 World Junior Squash Championships, which serves as the individual world Junior championship for squash players. The event took place in Tauranga in New Zealand from 19 to 24 July 2017.

Seeds

Draw and results

Finals

Top half

Section 1

Section 2

Section 3

Section 4

Bottom half

Section 5

Section 6

Section 7

Section 8

See also
2017 Men's World Junior Squash Championships
World Junior Squash Championships

References

External links
Women's World Junior Championships 2017 official website

World Junior Squash Championships
Wor
2017 in New Zealand sport
Squash tournaments in New Zealand
International sports competitions hosted by New Zealand